Vytautas Žalakevičius (14 April 1930 – 12 November 1996) was a Soviet and Lithuanian film director and screenwriter. His 1973 film That Sweet Word: Liberty! won the Golden Prize at the 8th Moscow International Film Festival.

Biography
Vytautas Žalakevičius studied mathematics and engineering at Kaunas University for two years. From 1951 to 1956 he studied film directing under Mikheil Chiaureli and Grigori Aleksandrov at VGIK in Moscow. He shot to fame with his 1956 film Adam wants to be a man starring Donatas Banionis and his teacher, Juozas Miltinis. His best known film, Nobody Wanted to Die, starring Lithuanian and Latvian actors, brought him international recognition. From 1974 to 1980, Žalakevičius was a staff director at Mosfilm, albeit his Moscow period was less productive, so he returned to Lithuania. Žalakevičius devoted himself to establishing independent Lithuanian film industry, and still worked with international cast of Lithuanian, Russian and Latvian actors. He also thought directing and writing and worked for television.

Recognition
Vytautas Žalakevičius was Artistic Director of the Lithuanian Film Studio. He was designated People's Artist of the Lithuanian SSR (1981) and People's Artist of the RSFSR (1980). He was co-chairman of the Lithuanian State Committee for Cinematography, member of the Lithuanian Writers' Union and the Union of Soviet Writers.

Filmography
 1956: Skenduolis (graduation work, short)
 1959: Adam wants to be a man (Adomas nori būti žmogumi)
 1963: Chronicles of one day (Vienos dienos kronika)
 1965: Nobody Wanted to Die (Niekas nenorėjo mirti)
 1968: Feelings, Lithuanian Film Studios
 1970: Everything about Columbus (Visa teisybė apie Kolumbą)
 1973: That Sweet Word: Liberty! (Это сладкое слово — свобода!)
1974: Breakdown (Авария) TV film
 1978: Centaurs (Kentaurai)
 1980: Story of an unknown man (Рассказ неизвестного человека)
 1981: Faktas
 1982: Apology (Atsiprašau)
 1987: Sunday in hell (Savaitgalį pragare)
 1991: Tale of a non-turned-off Moon (Žvėris, išeinantis iš jūros)

References

External links 

1930 births
1996 deaths
20th-century screenwriters
People from Kaunas
Communist Party of the Soviet Union members
Gerasimov Institute of Cinematography alumni
Academic staff of High Courses for Scriptwriters and Film Directors
Vytautas Magnus University alumni
Commander's Crosses of the Order of the Lithuanian Grand Duke Gediminas
People's Artists of the RSFSR
Recipients of the Lenin Komsomol Prize
Recipients of the Order of the Red Banner of Labour
Recipients of the USSR State Prize
Male screenwriters
Lithuanian dramatists and playwrights
Lithuanian film directors
Lithuanian screenwriters
Soviet dramatists and playwrights
Soviet film directors
Soviet screenwriters